El Jeremías is a 2015 Mexican comedy film, directed by Anwar Safa. The film stars Martín Castro as Jeremías, a bright child, who after learning he's a genius, struggles to succeed because of his family's poverty and ignorance.

The film premiered at the 30th Guadalajara International Film Festival. The film also received nine nominations at the 58th Ariel Awards including Best Director for Safa and Best Original Screenplay for Ana Sofía Clerici. The film was named on the shortlist for Mexico's entry for the Academy Award for Best Foreign Language Film at the 89th Academy Awards. The film was released in the United States on 21 October 2016.

Synopsis 
Set in Sonora, Mexico, the film tells the story of Jeremías (Martin Castro) an eight year old who finds out he is a gifted child and initiates a journey of self discovery. When an opportunistic psychologist makes contact with Jeremías, a new world of experiences open up to him but at the expense of being away from the family he loves. Jeremías must choose between this exciting but lonely new world he finds himself in or returning home to his loving family.

Cast
Martín Castro as Jeremías Gómez 
Karem Momo as Margarita Sánchez 
Paulo Galindo as Onésimo
Isela Vega as Herminia
Marcela Sotomayor as Audelia
Daniel Giménez Cacho as Dr. Federico Forni
Eduardo MacGregor as Don Gelipe
Jesús Ochoa as Don Enrique
Gabriela Roel as Dra. Soto
Juan Manuel Bernal as Ricardo Lecanda
Gerardo Diego as Raúl
Álvaro Peralta as Tomás
Irvin Gonzalez as Primo 2
Marcos Flores as Chamuco
Luna Audrey Martínez Castillo as Little Jeremías

Awards and nominations

References

External links
 

2015 films
2015 comedy films
Mexican comedy films
2010s Spanish-language films
2010s Mexican films